Mihkli Nature Reserve is a nature reserve situated in Mihkli village in south-western Estonia, in Pärnu County.

Mihkli Nature Reserve has been created to protect one of Estonia's most important oak forests. The oak forest, around 250 years old, has many oaks of unusually large size. In addition, birch and European crab apple also grow in the forest.

References

Nature reserves in Estonia
Geography of Pärnu County
Tourist attractions in Pärnu County